Luige is a small borough in Kiili Parish, Harju County, in northern Estonia, located about  south from the centre of Tallinn. As of 2011 Census, the settlement's population was 1280.
Luige gained its small borough status on 18 August 2008, before that it was a village.

References

Boroughs and small boroughs in Estonia